The Punta Judas Formation is a geologic formation in Costa Rica. It preserves fossils dating back to the Middle Miocene period.

Fossil content 
 Negaprion eurybathrodon

See also 

 List of fossiliferous stratigraphic units in Costa Rica

References 

Geologic formations of Costa Rica
Neogene Costa Rica
Paleontology in Costa Rica